Gigamyiopsis is a genus of parasitic flies in the family Tachinidae. There is one described species in Gigamyiopsis, G. funebris.

Distribution
Mexico

References

Dexiinae
Diptera of North America
Tachinidae genera
Monotypic Brachycera genera